Kingfisher Airport  is a public use airport located 1 mile northwest of Kingfisher, Oklahoma, in Kingfisher County. The airport is publicly owned by the city of Kingfisher.

Overview 
Kingfisher Airport has one runway, marked 18/36. The runway is 2,800 feet long and 60 feet wide with a concrete surface. 100LL self-service is available on site. For the 12 months ending 9 February 2018, 4,000 general-aviation and 10 military operations were recorded.

References

External links 
 Airnav Page for F92

Airports in Oklahoma
Kingfisher County, Oklahoma